EP Entertainment is an American record-label founded by Robert Robeo Eleazer and Tony, "The Negotiator Perez." EP Entertainment, which operates within the partnership of Universal Music Group, "EP," is a full-service entertainment company. Self-operating within the music publishing, touring, and merchandising divisions of the industry. Recently, in addition to film and television. EP Entertainment is home to a diverse roster of recording artists, writers, and producers, including: Alessia Cara, Sebastian Kole, Dylan Hyde, Ljay Currie, Sylah, Jared Evan, Riquel V (and producers), Click N Press, Fredro, and Big Tank.

Accomplishments, 2018 – Present

 In 2018, EP Entertainment celebrated the 60th Grammy Awards. With client/artist Alessia Cara, receiving the, 'Best New Artist' award.

References

2011 establishments in the United States
American record labels
Companies based in Los Angeles
Pop record labels
Hip hop record labels
Labels distributed by Universal Music Group
Publishing companies established in 2011
Record labels established in 2011
Soul music record labels